The Mikagura-uta (みかぐらうた, The Songs for the Service) is one of the three Tenrikyo scriptures, along with the Ofudesaki and the Osashizu. It was composed by the foundress of Tenrikyo, Miki Nakayama, from 1866 to 1875, and revised to its current version in 1882.

The Mikagura-uta is the liturgical book of the Service (otsutome), a religious ritual that has a central place in Tenrikyo. During the Service, the text to the Mikagura-uta is sung together with dance movements and musical accompaniment.

Etymology and meaning
"Mikagura-uta" can be subdivided into three sections. Mi is an honorific prefix. The word kagura is a generic term for any performance for a deity or deities in Japan. Although kagura are usually associated with Shinto shrines, there is also historical evidence of their association with Shugendō and Buddhist schools such as Shingon.
The word uta simply means "song" or "songs."

It is unknown when “Mikagura-uta” became the standardized title. During the years from 1867 and 1887, a variety of titles were used, with the most common being “Juni-kudari o-tsutome (no) uta” (the Twelve Songs of the Service). The earliest evidence of the current title dates to October 1888, when the songs was first formally published by Tenrikyo as “御かぐら歌.” However, since the kanji character 御 could potentially be read either as "O" and "On" in addition to "Mi," it still cannot be said with absolute certainty when “Mikagura-uta” became the standard title (in the past it was referred to sometimes as "Okagura-uta").

The original manuscript of the Mikagura-uta is lost; it was either confiscated by the authorities or it was connected to persecution and interference.

The first time the title of the Mikagura-uta took its current written form (only in hiragana) was in 1928, when the scripture was distributed to all churches to commemorate Shozen Nakayama’s marriage.

Tenrikyo Church Headquarters published an English translation of the Mikagura-uta in 1967.

Content and style
The Mikagura-uta is a scripture that is meant to be sung, danced with hand and feet movements, and accompanied by nine musical instruments. The scripture is sung in the style of a Japanese popular traditional song. The fifth section of the Mikagura-uta, the Twelve Songs, takes the form of a counting song, each song starting from one to ten. Nakayama Miki has been said to describe the nature of the counting song as "like children playing shuttlecock during the New Year's season, singing 'One, Two.'" The scripture was originally written in Japanese cursive syllabary (kana).

Composition

Songs for the Kagura Service

According to Tenrikyo followers, the Kagura Service (kagura-zutome かぐらづとめ) "reenacts God's creation of humankind" around the spot humankind was conceived (called the Jiba), located at Tenrikyo Church Headquarters in Tenri, Nara. Therefore, the Kagura Service can only be performed in one place. However, the songs are also sung during the Seated Service, which substitutes for the Kagura Service at all other church ceremonies, and which also can be performed individually or in a group.

Section One
In the autumn of 1866, Nakayama taught section one, which was originally worded, 
あしきはらいたすけたまい / てんりわうのみこと Ashiki harai, tasuke tamae, / Tenri-O-no-Mikoto.
Sweep away evils and save us, / Tenri-O-no-Mikoto.
In 1882, Nakayama altered the wording to the text used today: 
あしきをはらうてたすけたまえ / てんりわうのみこと Ashiki o harote tasuke tamae, / Tenri-O-no-Mikoto.
Sweeping away evils, please save us, / Tenri-O-no-Mikoto.

Section Two
Four years later, in 1870, Nakayama taught section two, which begins with the line,
ちよとはなしかみのいふこときいてくれ Choto hanashi Kami no yu koto kiite kure...
Just a word: Listen to what God says...

Section Three
Then in 1875, Nakayama taught section three, which was originally worded,
あしきはらいたすけたまい / いちれつすますかんろふだい Ashiki harai, tasuke tamae, Ichiretsu sumasu Kanrodai.
In 1882, she altered the wording to the text used today: 
あしきをはらうてたすけせきこむ / いちれつすましてかんろだい Ashiki o harote, tasuke sekikomu / Ichiretsu sumashite Kanrodai.
Sweeping away evils, hasten to save us. / All humankind equally purified, / The Kanrodai.

Songs for the Dance with Hand Movements
Section Four
In 1870, Nakayama taught section four, the "Eight Verses of the Yorozuyo" (よろづよ八首), in 1870. This was the last section to be composed.

Section Five
This section, known as the "Twelve Songs," was composed between January and August 1867. From 1867 to 1870, Nakayama taught her adherents the melodies and movements to accompany her texts.

Tenrikyo scholar Ueda Yoshinaru (上田嘉成) has suggested themes for each song:

History
One of the first recorded instances of performing the Mikagura-uta in public can be found in Shinmei Ashizu no Michi ("The History of Shinmei Ashizu Fellowship"):

"Some 30 to 50 followers gathered to do the Service of the Twelve Songs, the Teodori, every night at the fellowship in Honden (Osaka). They danced enthusiastically by beating the taiko, whose drumhead was worn out within three months. It was so lively that they sometimes had neighbors complaining. So they practiced the Teodori in vacant lots or on the Kunitsu Bridge near the fellowship. They made strenuous efforts in holding lessons until dawn...When members went to the house of a sick person to pray, they gathered with the musical instruments for the service. Before performing the service, they purified themselves with water ablutions. And they danced the Mikagura-uta softly beside the sick so as not to stir the slightest vibration on the tatami mat. They danced three times in the morning, three times in the afternoon, and three times in the evening. In this way the pouring of water and dancing were repeated."

Another account by Masui Rin, who attended to Nakayama Miki towards the end of her life, goes:

"We made a 'three-day and three-night prayer' to God to save a person. There were six followers for the Otefuri, two singers (jikata), eight or nine people in total visited the sick person and danced the Mikagura-uta. Saving a person through the Mikagura-uta was very popular and common."

References
Citations

Bibliography
 

Further reading
 Horiuchi, Midori. "Mikagura-uta and Tenrikyo." Tenri Journal of Religion 34, pp. 1–12.
 Kaneko, Tadashi. "The Ethical Meaning of Mikagura-uta." Tenri Journal of Religion 10, pp. 26–36.
 Tenrikyo Overseas Department. The Otefuri Guide. Fukaya, Tadamasa. A Commentary on the Mikagura-uta, The Songs for the Tsutome.'' Revised edition, Tenrikyo Overseas Mission Department, 1978, Tenri, Japan.

Tenrikyo
Japanese poetry collections
Prayer books